Earl Turbinton, Jr., also Naim Akban Ben-Tur and The African Cowboy (September 23, 1941, New Orleans - August 3, 2007, Baton Rouge) was an American saxophonist associated for decades with the Music of New Orleans.

Turbinton worked as a session musician for local R&B recordings from the late 1950s. He became involved with the New Orleans jazz scene early in his career, and became involved with a New Orleans project called Jazz Workshop, which gave music lessons to children and had its own club. Though it closed after a short time, Turbinton had intended for it to serve a place in the city's musical life analogous to that of Preservation Hall, but for newer jazz styles. Turbinton worked extensively in soul and R&B idioms in the 1960s, playing studio dates in New York, Detroit, and Los Angeles. He played alongside his brother, Willie Tee, in the funk group The Gaturs, and toured with Jerry Butler, The Four Tops, BB King, The Supremes, and The Temptations. In jazz, he worked with Joe Zawinul and Buster Williams in the 1970s. Turbinton took the name "The African Cowboy" in the 1980s as a protest against Reagan administration attempts to cut federal arts funding.

Discography
Brothers for Life, with Willie Tee (Rounder Records, 1987)
Dominion and Sustenance (Prog Records, 1998)

References

American jazz saxophonists
American male saxophonists
Jazz musicians from New Orleans
American male jazz musicians